The James Museum of Western & Wildlife Art is a museum located in St. Petersburg, Florida. The museum was founded by businessman Thomas James, and opened in 2018.  The museum has thousands of pieces from the James' collection, including both contemporary and traditional works.  Tom and Mary James spent $75 million creating the Museum.

References

External links

Museums in St. Petersburg, Florida
Museums established in 2018
2018 establishments in Florida